Victoria Peeters (born 17 May 1994), known as Tori Peeters, is a New Zealand athlete who competes in the javelin.

Peeters is originally from Gore, and then based in Cambridge, where she works at St Peter's School, she also spent several years studying in Dunedin. At the Sydney Track Classic in February 2020, Peeters threw 62.04m which placed her fifteenth for the year worldwide as well as being a personal best it was a New Zealand record breaking her own that she had set a fortnight before. In all, Peeters has broken the national New Zealand record eight times, first doing so in March 2014 when a throw of 54.45m, broke Kirsten Hellier’s record from 1999. Peeters was not selected for the 2020 New Zealand Olympic team. In 2022, Peeters won the Oceanic Championship and competed for New Zealand at the 2022 World Athletics Championships where she came 24th.

References

External links
 
 
 

1994 births
Living people
New Zealand female javelin throwers
Commonwealth Games competitors for New Zealand
Athletes (track and field) at the 2022 Commonwealth Games
People from Gore, New Zealand